Tang Sulan (born 1965) is a female Chinese writer. Although a prolific writer of novels, proses, and poems, she is best known as a children's writer, and for her fairy tales. She is also a professor with the Faculty of Arts at Hunan Normal University.

Biography
Tang was born in Ningxiang County, Hunan in 1965. She graduated from Hunan Normal University in 1985, where she majored in Chinese Literature. In 1988, she was accepted into Zhejiang University and graduated in 1991.

Tang started publish works in 1986. In 1999, she joined the China Writers Association. Later, she joined the China Association for Promoting Democracy. In 2008, she was a member of the 11th National Committee of Chinese People's Political Consultative Conference.

Works

Fairy tales
 Duoduo and Enchanter
 Duoduo and Witch
 Seeking the Happy Island
 Attic Spirit
 Walking Fireflies To Home
 Kid With Big Mouth
 Duoduo and Super Nurse
 Stupid Wolf and His Parent
 School Life of The Stupid Wolf
 Stupid Wolf's Trip
 Stupid Wolf's Stories
 How Beautiful The Small Witch
 Horse Live on The Roof
 Bunny and His Friends 
 Girl and Gardenia
 Great Garden

Novellas
 Zhangyawu's Diary 
 The Joy Zhen Shuai
 Super Genius Stupid Bear
 Black Love In Mountains

Proses and poems
 Rain in The Field
 Sounds of Dream
 What Words Could Never Say

Awards
 Stupid Wolf's Stories – 7th Xin Yixi Literary Prize (1994), 1st Zhang Tianyi Fairy Tale Prize (1999), Bingxin Children's Literary Prize, 5th National Children's Literary Award (1998)
 Duoduo and Witch – 4th National Children's Literary Award (1995)
 Horse Live on The Roof – 7th Chen Bochui Children's Literary Prize (1999)
 Bunny and His Friends – 5th National Book Award
 Girl and Gardenia – 2nd Zhang Tianyi Fairy Tale Prize (2001)
 Great Garden – 8th National Excellent Children's Literary Award (2010)
 One of the top ten people influencing Hunan

References

1965 births
People from Ningxiang
Hunan Normal University alumni
Zhejiang University alumni
Living people
Writers from Changsha
Chinese women novelists
Chinese children's writers
Chinese women children's writers
Chen Bochui Children's Literature Award winners